Purusia is a genus of longhorn beetles of the subfamily Lamiinae, containing the following species:

 Purusia acreana Lane, 1956
 Purusia wappesi Martins & Galileo, 2004

References

Hemilophini